Ali Mosaffa (born December 1, 1966) is an Iranian actor and director.

Life and career 
Mosaffa was born in Tehran, Iran. His father, Mozaher Mosaffa (born in Tafresh), was a Persian poet and professor of Persian literature at the University of Tehran. Mosaffa's mother, Amir Banoo Karimi, is also a leading scholar and professor of Persian literature at the University of Tehran and the eldest daughter of the Persian poet, Seyed Karim Amiri Firuzkuhi.

As a child, Mosaffa discovered his interest in story writing and English, contributing to his fluency in the language. He is a graduate of Civil engineering from the University of Tehran where he showed an interest in acting; making his debut in the 1991 film, Omid. In the following year he won best male actor at the Fajr International Film Festival for his role in Darius Mehrjui's film, Pari. Mosaffa met his future wife, Iranian actress Leila Hatami on the set of Mehrjui's 1996 film, Leila. The two married in 1999 and have two children, a son named Mani (born February 2007) and a daughter named Assal (born October 2008).

Mosaffa's experience with directing began with the short films, Incubus, The Neighbour and the documentary feature, Farib-e-She'r or The Deceit of Poesy. He then directed his first film in 2005 with Sima-ye Zani Dar Doordast (a.k.a. Portrait of a Lady Far Away), starring Leila Hatami and Homayoun Ershadi. The film was shortlisted for the Sutherland Trophy, awarded to the director of the most original first feature film screened at The Times BFI London Film Festival. His first feature film subsequently won the People's Choice Award at the Chicago International Film Festival and was nominated for the Crystal Globe at the 2005 Karlovy Vary International Film Festival. Mosaffa's second film, The Last Step /Pele ye Akhar, starring Leila Hatami has received acclaim from critics and audiences worldwide following its international premiere at the 2012 Karlovy Vary International Film Festival which gained Mosaffa the international critics' FIPRESCI prize for best film and awarded Leila Hatami with the Crystal Globe for Best Actress for her leading role in the film.

In October 2012, Mosaffa joined Oscar-winning director of A Separation, Asghar Farhadi in Paris; starring alongside Bérénice Bejo and Tahar Rahim for Farhadi's first foreign language film, Le Passé or The Past which premiered at the Cannes Film Festival in May 2013.

Filmography 
 Won't You Cry? by Alireza Motamedi (2022)
 Playing with Stars by Hatef Alimardani (2021)
 A Man Without a Shadow by Alireza Raisian (2019)
 Dance with Me by Soroush Sehhat (2019)
 Orange Days by Arash Lahouti (2018)
 The Second year of my collage by Rasul Sadr Ameli (2018)
 Pig by Mani Haghighi (2018)
 A Bigger Game by Abbas Nezamdoust (2017)
 Inversion by  Behnam Behzadi (2016)
 What's the Time in Your World? by Safi Yazdanian (2014)
 Le Passé (The Past) by Asghar Farhadi (2013)
 The Last Step by Ali Mosaffa (2012)
 Beloved Sky by Dariush Mehrjui (2011)
 There Are Things You Don't Know by Fardin Saheb-Zamani (2010)
 Who Killed Amir? by Mehdi Karampoor (2006)
 Another Place by Mehdi Karampoor (2003)
 Mix by Dariush Mehrjui (2001)
 Dear Cousin is Lost Dariush Mehrjui (2000)
 Party by Saman Moghadam (2000)
 Lost Girls (1999)
 Leila by Dariush Mehrjui (1998)
 Minou Tower by Ebrahim Hatamikia (1996)
 Pari by Dariush Mehrjui (1994)
 All My Daughters by Esmail Soltanian (1992)
 Omid by Habib Kavosh (1991)

Directing 
 Absence (2021) Feature Film
 The Last Step (2012) Feature Film
 Portrait of a Lady Far Away (2005) Feature Film
 Farib-e-She'r or The Deceit of Poesy (1996) Documentary Short Film
 The Neighbor (1999) Short Film
 Incubus (1991) Short Film

Television series 
 The English Bag
 Paridokht

Awards 
 Best Adapted Screenplay for The Last Step from the 16th Iranian House of Cinema Film Festival, 2014
 FIPRESCI International Critics' Prize for The Last Step from the Karlovy Vary International Film Festival, 2012
 Crystal Simorgh for Best Adapted Screenplay for The Last Step from the Fajr International Film Festival, 2012
 Crystal Simorgh for Best Supporting Actor for Pari, from Fajr International Film Festival, 1995

References

External links 

1966 births
Living people
People from Tehran
People from Tafresh
Iranian screenwriters
Iranian film directors
Iranian male film actors
University of Tehran alumni
Crystal Simorgh for Best Supporting Actor winners